Styāna (Sanskrit; Tibetan phonetic: mukpa) is a Buddhist term that is translated as "lethargy", "gloominess", etc. In the Mahayana tradition, styāna is defined as a mental factor that causes the mind to be withdrawn, unclear, and unable to focus.

Styāna is identified as one of the twenty secondary unwholesome factors within the Mahayana Abhidharma teachings

Definitions
The Abhidharma-samuccaya states: 
What is gloominess' It is the way in which the mind cannot function properly and is associated with moha. Its function is to aid all basic and proximate emotions.

Mipham Rinpoche states:
Lethargy belongs to the category of delusion. It means to be withdrawn, mentally incapable, and unable to focus on an object because of heaviness of body and mind. It forms the support for the disturbing emotions.

Alexander Berzin explains:
Foggymindedness (rmugs-pa) is a part of naivety (moha). It is a heavy feeling of body and mind that makes the mind unclear, unserviceable, and incapable either of giving rise to a cognitive appearance of its object or of apprehending the object correctly. When the mind actually becomes unclear, due to foggymindedness, this is mental dullness (bying-ba).

See also
 Mental factors (Buddhism)
 Kleshas (Buddhism)

References

Sources
 Berzin, Alexander (2006), Primary Minds and the 51 Mental Factors
 Guenther, Herbert V. &  Leslie S. Kawamura (1975), Mind in Buddhist Psychology: A Translation of Ye-shes rgyal-mtshan's "The Necklace of Clear Understanding" Dharma Publishing. Kindle Edition.
 Kunsang, Erik Pema (translator) (2004). Gateway to Knowledge, Vol. 1. North Atlantic Books.

Further reading
 Bhikkhu Bodhi (2003), A Comprehensive Manual of Abhidhamma, Pariyatti Publishing

Unwholesome factors in Buddhism
Sanskrit words and phrases